Károly Charles Horváth was a Hungarian-American soccer player who spent one season in the National Professional Soccer League, one in the International Soccer League and at least two in the German-American Soccer League.  He also earned one cap with the U.S. national team.

Club career
He started his professional career at Újpesti Dózsa in Hungary. He moved to Canada as a teenager and played for Hungária SC Montréal and Montréal Concordia FC in the National Soccer League. In 1961, he helped Montréal Concordia win the Canadian Carling's Red Cap Trophy (Challenge Trophy). In 1962, Horvath was with the New York Hungaria of the German American Soccer League when they won the National Challenge Cup.  He remained with Hungaria through at least 1964 and also played in the Eastern Canada Professional Soccer League with the Hamilton Steelers. In 1965, he played with the New Yorkers of the International Soccer League, and later returned to the ECPSL to play with Montréal Italica. Finally, in 1967, he spent a single season with the Philadelphia Spartans of the National Professional Soccer League.

National team
Horvath earned his one cap with the national team in a 10–0 loss to England on 27 May 1964.

References

American soccer players
Hungarian emigrants to the United States
Újpest FC players
Hungarian footballers
United States men's international soccer players
German-American Soccer League players
International Soccer League players
National Professional Soccer League (1967) players
Philadelphia Spartans players
Living people
Association football midfielders
Year of birth missing (living people)
Montreal Concordia players
Hamilton Steelers (ECPSL) players
Canadian National Soccer League players
Eastern Canada Professional Soccer League players